Villa Place Historic District is a national historic district located at Rocky Mount, Nash County, North Carolina.  It encompasses 321 contributing buildings and 1 contributing structure in a residential section of Rocky Mount. The buildings primarily date between about 1900 and 1950, and include notable examples of Queen Anne, Colonial Revival, Classical Revival, and Bungalow / American Craftsman style residential architecture. Located in the district is the separately listed Machaven.  Other notable buildings include the W.D. Cochran House (c. 1900), Mills-Watson House (c. 1914), Aladdin Homes Company "kit houses," the James Craig Braswell School (1940), Draine Confectionery (c. 1930), and West End Grocery (c. 1930).

It was listed on the National Register of Historic Places in 1999, with a boundary increase in 2002.

References

Historic districts on the National Register of Historic Places in North Carolina
Queen Anne architecture in North Carolina
Colonial Revival architecture in North Carolina
Neoclassical architecture in North Carolina
National Register of Historic Places in Nash County, North Carolina